Dale Earnhardt was an American professional stock car driver and team owner, who raced from 1975 to 2001 in the NASCAR Winston Cup Series, most notably driving the No. 3 Chevrolet for Richard Childress Racing. He began his career in the 1975 World 600 and won a total of 76 Winston Cup races over the course of his 26-year career, including ten times at Talladega Superspeedway and the 1998 Daytona 500. He is the only driver in the modern era of NASCAR (1972–present) to score at least one win in each of four different decades (having collected his first career win in 1979, 38 wins in the 1980s, 35 wins in the 1990s, and his final two career wins in 2000). He won seven Winston Cup championships from 1980 to 1994, a record held with Richard Petty and Jimmie Johnson.

NASCAR

Winston Cup Series
Earnhardt won 76 races in the Winston Cup Series from 1979 to 2000. Of those, 67 wins came with Richard Childress Racing in the No. 3, with sponsorship from Wrangler Jeans and GM Goodwrench. Earnhardt won his first six races in 1979 and 1980 driving for Rod Osterlund, winning Rookie of the Year honors in 1979 and his first of seven championships in 1980. He drove for Bud Moore Engineering from 1982 to 1983, picking up three victories, before moving to Childress in 1984, where he won six more championships (1986, 1987, 1990, 1991, 1993, 1994).

Wins by track
Earnhardt won on 17 different tracks in the Cup Series during his career. Most of his success came at Talladega (10), Bristol, Atlanta, and Darlington (9), with these four tracks accounting for 37 of his 76 wins. Earnhardt only won three points-paying Winston Cup races at Daytona, although he won six Busch Clashes, twelve Twin 125 qualifying races, and seven Busch series races, accounting for

Exhibition races

Busch Series
Earnhardt competed part-time in the NASCAR Busch Series from 1982 to 1994, winning 21 races. He most notably won the Daytona 300 seven times, a feat later replicated by Tony Stewart. His first win in 1982 was the inaugural race in what was then known as the Budweiser Late Model Sportsman Series. His first four victories came in cars owned by Robert Gee before starting Dale Earnhardt, Inc. in 1984. He would win his last 17 races in the No. 8 and No. 3 from 1985 to 1994.

Winston West Series

North Tour

See also
 List of all-time NASCAR Cup Series winners

References

NASCAR race wins
Career achievements of racing drivers
NASCAR-related lists